Nikita Kokorin (born 22 July 1989, Alma-Ata) is a Kazakhstani water polo player. At the 2012 Summer Olympics, he competed for the Kazakhstan men's national water polo team in the men's event. He is 6 ft 3 inches tall.

References

Kazakhstani male water polo players
1989 births
Living people
Olympic water polo players of Kazakhstan
Water polo players at the 2012 Summer Olympics
Kazakhstani people of Russian descent

Sportspeople from Almaty